This is a detailed discography for American country music singer Johnny Paycheck. Paycheck initially recorded some singles under the name of Donny Young before releasing a few singles on Hilltop and then a string of albums with Little Darlin' Records in the mid-60s. In 1971, he signed with Epic Records and stayed with the label for over 10 years. Overall, Paycheck's discography consists of 30 studio albums (including some belated issues of previously unreleased material), 4 live albums and 1 collaborative studio album, in addition to many compilation albums. Given the obscure nature of much of Paycheck's work, sources have been added for each of the releases. Though only some could be verified via the Recording Industry Association of America's website, Paycheck's own website asserts that he accrued 6 Gold certified albums, 2 Platinum certified albums and 1 double Platinum album over his long career. Johnny Paycheck's last gospel recording before he died was a duet with a young unknown Christian artist named Robert Hampton in 1992, titled "I Love My Jesus" written by Terry Parkerson. The recording was for radio airplay only, never for sale to the public. It charted nationally. The song can be heard on YouTube under Robert Hampton and Johnny Paycheck.

Studio albums

1960s

1970s

1980s

1990s and 2000s

Collaborative albums

Live albums

Compilation albums

Singles

1960s

1970s

1980s–1990s

Other singles

Singles with George Jones

Guest singles

B-Sides

Notes
A^ Take This Job and Shove It also peaked at No. 72 on the Billboard 200 and No. 85 on the RPM Top Albums chart in Canada.
B^ "She's All I Got" also peaked at No. 91 on the Billboard Hot 100.
C^ "The Outlaw's Prayer" also peaked at No. 27 on New Zealand Singles Chart

References

Country music discographies
Discographies of American artists